Mickleton railway station was situated on the Tees Valley Railway between Barnard Castle and Middleton-in-Teesdale. It served the village of Mickleton. The station opened to passenger traffic on 12 May 1868, and closed on 30 November 1964. The site, to the south of the village, now serves as a car parking area for walkers using the Tees Valley Railway walk.

References

External links
Mickleton Station at Disused Stations

Disused railway stations in County Durham
Former North Eastern Railway (UK) stations
Railway stations in Great Britain opened in 1868
Railway stations in Great Britain closed in 1964
Beeching closures in England